In additive combinatorics, the Erdős sumset conjecture is a conjecture which states that if a subset  of the natural numbers  has a positive upper density then there are two infinite subsets  and  of  such that  contains the sumset . It was posed by Paul Erdős, and was proven in 2019 in a paper by Joel Moreira, Florian Richter and Donald Robertson.

See also
List of conjectures by Paul Erdős

Notes

Conjectures
Conjectures that have been proved
Paul Erdős
Combinatorics